Frances Evelyn Henley (1876–1955) was an American architect. She was the first woman to study architecture at the Rhode Island School of Design and the first woman to independently practice architecture in Rhode Island.

Early life and education
Henley was born in 1876 in Crompton, Rhode Island to Charles A. and Mary E. Booth Henley. She grew up in Providence, Rhode Island. Henley's parents wanted her to become a school teacher. She disagreed and became the first woman to study at the Rhode Island School of Design for architecture. In 1897 she graduated, with honors.

Career

Eliza Greene Metcalf Radeke helped Henley secure employment as a drafter with Howard K. Hilton, though after a few years Henley quit her job with Hilton due to health problems. She pursued architecture as an independent consultant starting in 1904, making her the first female architect in Rhode Island to practice under her own name. She worked alongside Franklin J. Sawtelle, who shared office space with Henley. In 1912, she began working with architect Arthur L. Almy. He died in 1924, and Henley became the president of the firm and ran the organization for 30 years, under the agreement should would never marry. Henley designed mainly private residences along the Atlantic coast. She also designed the Wheeler School in Providence.

In 1936, she quit the Providence firm and relocated to Cranston, Rhode Island. In Cranston, she lived with her partner, Nellie Evelyn Livermore. Livermore worked as Henley's assistant. The couple broke up over health problems in 1952.

Later life and legacy
She died in 1955 at her home in Pawtuxet, Rhode Island.

Henley's papers are held in the collection of the Rhode Island Historical Society.

References

1876 births
1955 deaths
20th-century American architects
People from West Warwick, Rhode Island
People from Warwick, Rhode Island
Rhode Island School of Design alumni
American women architects
Architects from Providence, Rhode Island
LGBT women
LGBT people from Rhode Island
20th-century American women
20th-century American LGBT people